Stuart Taylor (13 April 1900 – 2 February 1978) was an Australian cricketer. He played two first-class matches for Tasmania between 1930 and 1931.

See also
 List of Tasmanian representative cricketers

References

External links
 

1900 births
1978 deaths
Australian cricketers
Tasmania cricketers
Cricketers from Melbourne